Kohukohu is a village on the Hokianga Harbour in the Northland Region of New Zealand. It was one of the first European settlements in New Zealand.

Kohukohu is situated on the northern shore of the harbour where it splits into two rivers, the Mangamuka River branching inland to the northeast and the Waihou River leading towards the east past Mangungu, Horeke and Rangiahua.

Where the harbour divides there is a small island called Motiti which was painted by Augustus Earle, the first European artist to spend several months in New Zealand, during his visit to the Hokianga in 1827. He wrote "we were sailing up a spacious sheet of water, which became considerably wider after entering it; while majestic hills rose on each side .... looking up the river we beheld various headlands stretching into the water and gradually contracting its width, 'till they became fainter and fainter in the distance and all was lost in the azure of the horizon".

History and culture

Pre-European settlement
According to Te Tai Tokerau tradition, the legendary Polynesian explorer Kupe visited the area prior to his return voyage to Hawaiiki. Angry at the food from the hangi (earth oven) being insufficiently cooked, he swore at those responsible. Kohukohu is Māori for a swearword or expletive.

European settlement

The country's first Catholic mass was celebrated 8 kilometres north of Kohukohu at Totara Point in 1838. The Hokianga Sawmill Company built a sawmill in 1878.

For nearly one hundred years Kohukohu was an important timber milling town and the largest commercial centre on the north of the harbour. In 1900, the township had a population of almost 2,000 people.

Marae
Kohukohu has three marae affiliated with the hapū Te Ihutai: Pateoro or Te Karae Marae and Pōwhiri meeting house which affiliates with Te Rarawa; Pikipāria Marae and Ngarunui meeting house which affiliates with Ngāpuhi; and Tauteihiihi Marae and Tokimatahourua meeting house.

There are also three marae affiliated with other Te Rarawa hapū: Motuti Marae and Tamatea meeting house are affiliated with Ngāti Tamatea, Ngāti Te Maara and Te Kai Tutae. Ngāi Tupoto Marae and Ngāhuia meeting house are affiliated with Ngāi Tūpoto and Ngāti Here. Waiparera Marae and Nukutawhiti meeting house are affiliated with Patutoka, Tahāwai, Te Whānau Pani and Te Hokokeha.

In October 2020, the Government committed $1,407,731 from the Provincial Growth Fund to upgrade Ngāi Tupoto Marae and 8 other marae of Te Rarawa, creating 100 jobs.

New Zealand's oldest bridge 
The Kohukohu footbridge near the centre of the town is the first stone bridge built in New Zealand, and is the oldest surviving bridge of any construction still in existence in the country. It was built some time between 1843 and 1851 at the mouth of the Waihouuru Creek where it flowed into the Hokianga Harbour. At the time, ships from Sydney used sandstone blocks as ballast, which they left at Kohukohu in exchange for more-valuable timber, and these sandstone blocks were used to build the bridge. When a timber mill opened next to the bridge in 1879 sawdust was used to gradually reclaim the harbour, and the reclamation has buried most of the bridge, which is now about 100 m back from the foreshore. The bridge was registered in 2008 as a Category 1 Historic Place.

Kohukohu today

Today, Kohukohu is a community of 150 people who live within the village and approximately 350 who live in the surrounding area. The smaller settlements of Tauteihiihi, Motukaraka, Pikiparia, Te Karae, Mata, and Paponga are very close by.  Kohukohu has a school, general store, café, art galleries, arts and crafts shop, hotel, voluntary fire and ambulance services, and a health clinic. There are also two churches and three marae within the locality.

In recent years, Kohukohu has become a destination for travellers who are attracted by its scenery, history, culture and arts.

Demographics
Statistics New Zealand describes Kohukohu as a rural settlement. Kohukohu is part of the larger Kohukohu-Broadwood statistical area.

Kohukohu had a population of 168 at the 2018 New Zealand census, unchanged since the 2013 census, and a decrease of 18 people (−9.7%) since the 2006 census. There were 81 households, comprising 78 males and 90 females, giving a sex ratio of 0.87 males per female. The median age was 58.0 years (compared with 37.4 years nationally), with 24 people (14.3%) aged under 15 years, 21 (12.5%) aged 15 to 29, 72 (42.9%) aged 30 to 64, and 54 (32.1%) aged 65 or older.

Ethnicities were 75.0% European/Pākehā, 37.5% Māori, 1.8% Pacific peoples, and 3.6% Asian. People may identify with more than one ethnicity.

Of those people who chose to answer the census's question about religious affiliation, 50.0% had no religion, 32.1% were Christian and 1.8% had other religions.

Of those at least 15 years old, 39 (27.1%) people had a bachelor's or higher degree, and 27 (18.8%) people had no formal qualifications. The median income was $19,500, compared with $31,800 nationally. 9 people (6.2%) earned over $70,000 compared to 17.2% nationally. The employment status of those at least 15 was that 33 (22.9%) people were employed full-time, 21 (14.6%) were part-time, and 9 (6.2%) were unemployed.

Education
Kohukohu School is a co-educational full primary (years 1-8) school with a roll of  students as of  The school was established in 1883, but moved to a new location in 1972 because the ground on the original site was unstable. The original site with the original school building is now a historic reserve.

Notable people
James Fisher-Harris, rugby league player for the Penrith Panthers

Notes

External links
Kohukohu Community website
Kohukohu School website
Village Arts website
Kohukohu on the Hokianga Tourism Association website
Local places to stay Accommodation 

Hokianga
Populated places in the Northland Region